Banachiewicz is a largely degraded lunar impact crater that is located near the eastern limb of the Moon.

Geography

Banachiewicz crater is located near the eastern limb of the Moon. It is largely degraded. Portions of the western and southwest rim still survive as low ridges in the surface, while the remainder is a jumble of irregular terrain with little definition. It was named after Polish astronomer Tadeusz Banachiewicz. Due to its location, this crater appears very foreshortened to an earthbound viewer.  The visibility is more than partly affected by libration, which can at times completely conceal this formation from view.

There are two small impact craters of note within the interior: Banachiewicz B is adjacent to the western rim, while the smaller, former Banachiewicz F crater—renamed by the IAU as "Knox-Shaw"—lies on the eastern floor of the walled inner plain. It is located closer to the midpoint, and 12 km in circumference. It was named after British astronomer Harold Knox-Shaw. Knox-Shaw is a bowl-shaped formation of the type that is found over much of the lunar surface. The rim is circular and the inner walls slope down to a small interior floor at the midpoint. It is not significantly eroded and has no other distinguishing features.

Just to the northeast of this formation is the large walled plain Neper, which lies on the southern edge of Mare Marginis. The crater Schubert is located to the south of Banachiewicz, while Schubert E is attached to the exterior of the western rim.

Satellite craters

By convention these features are identified on lunar maps by placing the letter on the side of the crater midpoint that is closest to Banachiewicz.

Gallery

See also 
 1286 Banachiewicza, asteroid

References

External links
 LTO-63C1 Knox-Shaw — L&PI topographic map

Impact craters on the Moon